Sexy Zone is a four-member Japanese boy band managed by Johnny & Associates. Originally consisting of Shori Sato, Kento Nakajima, Marius Yo, Fuma Kikuchi and Sou Matsushima, they debuted their group age average was 14.6.  In 2013 they appeared in Kouhaku for the first time performing their hit song. Sexy Zone is the 5th group from Johnny & Associates to debut as special supporters for the "FIVB World Cup Volleyball" in 2011 after V6 (1995), Arashi (1999), NEWS (2003) and Hey! Say! JUMP (2007) from the same agency. They sold 3 million copies in Japan. Yo left the group and retired from the entertainment industry in 2022.

Career
Sexy Zone was announced as a group in a press conference on September 29, 2011. Johnny & Associates's CEO Johnny Kitagawa said, "The group name came from Michael Jackson's sexiness". The members were revealed to be Kento Nakajima, Fuma Kikuchi, Shori Sato, So Matsushima, and Marius Yo. Kitagawa chose the members considering the "sexiness of men".

After the press conference, the members appeared in Teigeki Johnnys Imperial Theatre Special "Kis-My-Ft2 with Johnny's Jr.", and premiered their debut song "Sexy Zone", which was subsequently released on November 16, 2011 from Pony Canyon. This song was also the image song of the 2011 FIVB Women's World Cup and the 2011 FIVB Men's World Cup. The group were special supporters of 2011 FIVB World Cup. this song was ranked in the Oricon charts.

Sexy Zone was named Musical Ambassadors of the FIVB Volleyball World Cup on March 2, 2015. On the FIVB world cup they performed their 10th single, Cha-Cha-Cha-Champion and announced the players as they entered the court.
In 2016, their official Japanese Volleyball team cheering song "Shouri no hi made" was released to cheer on the volleyball team.

It was reported by NikkanSports in 2014 that the group's then-upcoming single was only recorded by three of its five members. Their seventh single "Otoko Never Give Up", eighth single "Kimi ni Hitomebore" and their ninth single "Cha-Cha-Cha Champion" only featured members Kento Nakajima, Fuma Kikuchi and Shori Sato. This resulted in rumours amongst fans about the future of Marius Yo and Sou Matsushima, the two youngest members of the group. The reason behind their temporary removal from the group was that Sexy Zone had become popular and the schedule was almost packed, resulting in Sou Matsushima unable to travel from Shizuoka to his work. Marius Yo was disbanded from the group temporarily to balance the group formation. In 2015, for their 12th single, Marius Yo and Sou Matsushima returned to Sexy Zone from Johnny's Jr groups, as Sou Matsushima had enrolled into a high school in Tokyo.

Members

Former Member

Timeline

Discography

Studio albums
 One Sexy Zone (2012)
 Sexy Second (2014)
 Sexy Power3 (2015)
 Welcome to Sexy Zone (2016)
 Sexy Zone 5th Anniversary Best (2016)
 XYZ=Repainting (2018)
 Pages (2019)
 Pop × Step!? (2020)
 SZ10TH (2021)
 The Highlight (2022)

Filmography

Television
 Yan Yan Jump (April 2011- TV Tokyo)
 Johnnys'Jr. land (October 2011- Sky Perfect TV)
 Waratte Iitomo! (2011-11-03 Fuji TV)
 Music Station (2011-11-11, 2011-11-18, 2012-04-27 TV Asahi)
 Sexy Zone Channel (Start 2014-02-26 - Fuji TV)
 ZIP
Fuller House (2017-12-22 Netflix)

References

External links
 
 Johnnys profile（Japanese）
 Johnnys profile（English）

Japanese boy bands
Johnny & Associates
Japanese idol groups
Musical groups established in 2011
Japanese-language singers
Japanese pop music groups
Pony Canyon artists
Universal Music Japan artists
Musical groups from Tokyo
2011 establishments in Japan